Wetheredsville is an unincorporated community in Baltimore, Maryland, United States.  James Lawrence Kernan Hospital was listed on the National Register of Historic Places in 1979.

References

Unincorporated communities in Maryland